Glenwood Springs is a home rule municipality that is the county seat of Garfield County, Colorado, United States. The city population was 9,963 at the 2020 United States Census. Glenwood Springs is located at the confluence of the Roaring Fork River and the Colorado River, connecting the Roaring Fork Valley and a series of smaller towns up and down the Colorado River.

Glenwood Springs is a destination for many vacationers, and is known for its hot springs.

History
For thousands of years, the area that is now Glenwood Springs was populated by Indigenous people before the colonization of the Americas. The oral history of the Kapuuta and Mouache bands recall that Glenwood Springs is located within the "traditional Nuuchiu tuvupu (The People's Land) of the Subuagan and Parianuche bands." Fred Conetah's History of the Northern Utes states that the Yampa or White River bands used the area, which is now in the Ute ancestral jurisdiction. The Utes were nomadic hunter-gatherers who seasonally used the natural hot springs in the area. The U.S. government surveyed the land in the mid-19th century, although they had no claim on the land. An 1868 treaty negotiated by the Tabeguache Ute Chief Ouray preserved the hunting grounds in the area of present-day Glenwood Springs.

For a short time in the 19th century, Glenwood Springs was known as "Defiance", a name sometimes still used by local teams or businesses. Defiance was established in 1883, as a camp of tents, saloons, and brothels with an increasing amount of cabins and lodging establishments. It was populated with gamblers, gunslingers, and prostitutes. Isaac Cooper was the founder of the town. His wife Sarah was having a hard time adjusting to the frontier life and, in an attempt to make her environment somewhat more comfortable, persuaded the founders to change the name to Glenwood Springs, Colorado, after her hometown of Glenwood, Iowa.

Glenwood Springs, then a small encampment, was not the original county seat of Garfield County.  Rather, a larger mining town that had been seeded with silver in order to attract miners on top of the Flat Tops mountains named Carbonate was the original county seat.  Carbonate briefly had a post office, but the mail courier who won the contract to deliver mail to Carbonate found only one miner living there on his first delivery, which took 65 km horizontally and 1.5 km vertically.  In the end, the courier paid the miner $100 in 1880s dollars to move out so that the post office could be closed and he would not have to make the journey again.  Carbonate remained the county seat for only four months before Glenwood Springs was selected by voters as the new location.

The location of Glenwood Springs, and its railroad stop, established a center of commerce in the area. The city has seen well-known visitors, including President Teddy Roosevelt, who spent a summer vacation living out of the historic Hotel Colorado. Doc Holliday, who was known for the O.K. Corral gunfight, spent the final months of his life in Glenwood Springs and is buried in the town's original Pioneer Cemetery above Bennett Avenue.  Kid Curry is buried in the same location.  The serial killer Ted Bundy was imprisoned in the Glenwood Springs jail until he escaped on the night of December 30, 1977, an escape which went undetected for 17 hours.

Glenwood Springs was one of the first places in the United States to have electric lights. The original lighting was installed in 1897 inside of the Fairy Caves in Iron Mountain. Later, a dam was built in Glenwood Canyon, providing water for the Shoshone power plant. The plant began producing power on May 16, 1909, and retains the largest and oldest water rights to the Colorado River, the "Shoshone Call", which is valuable for the protection of Colorado River water rather than the minimal electricity produced.

In 2015, the town was named the "Most Vibrant Small Town Arts Environment in the United States" by Southern Methodist University and the 5th Best Place to Live in America by Outside magazine. It was named the "Most Fun Town in America" by Rand McNally and USA Today in 2011.

Geography

Glenwood Springs is located in the narrow mountain valleys that host the confluence of the Colorado River and the Roaring Fork River. The surrounding terrain is steeply contoured on all sides, containing several caves. The geology of the area includes geothermal activity, such as the local hot springs, but it is also evidenced through other features such as the Dotsero maar. Occasional proposals to leverage the geothermal energy for other purposes arise. Glenwood Springs has experienced several mudslides throughout its history, a threat mitigated somewhat by public works.

Glenwood Springs is considered a walkable town by PBS and Walking Magazine, including in the Walking Town Hall of Fame. Though the town's geography makes it a natural environment for pedestrians and cyclists; there are also trails running throughout and around the city that resulted from planning efforts that began in the 1980s in response to congestion and traffic.

Due to civic planning during the early years of the city, Glenwood Springs owns some senior water rights to tributaries of the Colorado River. Glenwood Springs water supply is sufficient for its population, unlike some areas of the American West, conservation plans have been enacted anyway for largely environmental reasons. The town's drinking water is supplied primarily through senior rights to major watersheds in the Flat Tops Wilderness Area, and the tap water is generally of safe quality.

Mineral deposits exist further up the Crystal River and in the Roaring Fork area, and petroleum resources are ample in western Garfield County, which brings tax revenue to Glenwood Springs. However, the town itself lies outside of the Colorado Mineral Belt, and there are no mineral or oil and gas sources near Glenwood Springs proper or its watersheds. While the paucity of minerals and oil was disastrous for early miners hoping to strike it rich, modern Glenwood Springs has none of the typical Colorado mountain town legacy of resource extraction, generally good air quality, water, and land. however, Valley inversions and heavy traffic to Aspen can lead to air quality problems during exceptionally cold spells of winter.

At the 2020 United States Census, the city had a total area of  including  of water.

Climate
Glenwood Springs has a generally continental steppe climate, much more consistently stable than that of the Front Range and most of Colorado, though still decidedly continental and prone to periods of extreme weather. Microclimates dominate Glenwood Springs, with areas close to the rivers often much more damp and cool than hillsides.

Cultivation 
There is local fooding in the Roaring Fork Valley area.

In 1904, apples and peaches are produced in the nearby town of Silt. Glenwood Springs first hosted the Strawberry Days Festival in 1898, which is Colorado's oldest festival and the oldest continuously held civic celebration west of the Mississippi River.  In 2022, a 3-day celebration was held to commemorate the 125th year of the Strawberry Days Festival.

Nearby farms surrounding and in Glenwood Springs grow different fruit throughout the year. A ranch located in Glenwood Springs named Orchard Creek Ranch is produces Red Delicious apples.

Demographics

Glenwood Springs is the principal city of the Glenwood Springs, CO Micropolitan Statistical Area.

As of the census of 2000, there were 7,736 people, 3,216 households, and 1,926 families residing in the city. The racial makeup of the city was 90.42% White, 0.23% African American, 0.71% Native American, 0.80% Asian, 0.08% Pacific Islander, 5.82% from other races, and 1.94% from two or more races. Hispanic or Latino of any race were 13.30% of the population. 13.9% were of German, 13.3% English, 12.9% Irish, 7.6% American and 7.0% Italian ancestry according to Census 2000.

There were 3,216 households, out of which 30.0% had children under the age of 18 living with them, 47.7% were married couples living together, 8.5% had a female householder with no husband present, and 40.1% were non-families. 29.7% of all households were made up of individuals, and 8.5% had someone living alone who was 65 years of age or older. The average household size was 2.37 and the average family size was 2.97.

In the city, the population was spread out, with 23.1% under the age of 18, 9.5% from 18 to 24, 33.3% from 25 to 44, 24.9% from 45 to 64, and 9.2% who were 65 years of age or older. The median age was 36 years. For every 100 females, there were 103.5 males. For every 100 females age 18 and over, there were 100.7 males.

The median income for a household in the city was $43,934, and the median income for a family was $52,903. Males had a median income of $38,506 versus $29,272 for females. The per capita income for the city was $23,449. About 3.5% of families and 7.9% of the population were below the poverty line, including 6.0% of those under age 18 and 5.5% of those age 65 or over.

Despite being an expensive area in which to live, Glenwood Springs has the highest life expectancy in America for 40-year-olds making working wages.

Economy

Glenwood Springs' economy has centered on hospitality for vacationers since its foundation, unlike many of Colorado's mountain towns, which were generally settled for mining or railroad purposes. Much of the tourism, particularly during the summer months, typically involves local outdoor sports. In the winter, the proximity of Glenwood Springs to multiple major ski resorts and its hot springs draw visitors.

Glenwood does not primarily serve as a bedroom community. In 2020, it received stimulus money. Due to severe geographic constraints, if further population growth is to be accommodated, it must come primarily from multifamily infill development.

Bloomberg Business named Glenwood Springs the 7th wealthiest small town in America in 2015, due principally to the influence of Aspen. Glenwood Springs and Aspen share a micropolitan statistical area, and businesses often serve the entire Valley. Many small businesses start in the area due to the ambient wealth and a strong preference for local business, but they typically relocate to larger metropolitan areas after successful growth leads to needs for more affordable labor and physical resources.

Internet access
Comcast provides cable modem access over coax to the entire city along with television and mobile service, while CenturyLink offers DSL service to all residents. In 2020, Glenwood Springs was locally installing 140 miles of fiber-optic networking to serve the city as a participating member of Project THOR, an initiative by the Northwest Colorado Council of Governments to bring networking to towns throughout northwest Colorado.

Education
Glenwood Springs hosts two of the campuses and the administrative offices of the Colorado Mountain College system. The town is the headquarters of the Roaring Fork RE-1 school district. In all, the city has 5 public K-12 schools: Glenwood Springs High School, Yampah Mountain High School (an alternative school not part of RE-1), Glenwood Springs Middle School, Glenwood Springs Elementary School, and Sopris Elementary School. St. Stephen's Catholic School, which was founded in 1982, is K-8.

Media
Glenwood Springs' principal news source is the Post Independent, a local daily newspaper created by the merger of the Glenwood Post, with a history stretching back in various forms to 1889, and a newer competitor, the Glenwood Independent. It has received numerous awards over the years, including the 2016 American Society of News Editors' Osborne Award for Editorial Leadership. The newspaper and many of its reporters have been recognized by the Colorado Associated Press for a variety of distinctions.

KMTS provides local country radio along the Colorado River, and KSNO-FM serves the Roaring Fork Valley.

The town is also served by local television KREG-TV, alongside K42EV-D, a repeater of Grand Junction ABC affiliate KJCT-LP and K32NO-D, a repeater of Rocky Mountain PBS.

Transportation

Amtrak and other rail
Amtrak's California Zephyr, operating daily in both directions between Chicago and Emeryville, California, serves Glenwood Springs, the second busiest station in Colorado, behind only Denver's Union Station.  The first commercially successful dome cars were built for the Zephyr family, inspired by Glenwood Canyon.

Due to the scenery, timetables designed for maximum sunlight in Glenwood Canyon, the proximity of downtown, and local tourism, Glenwood Springs receives more passenger traffic than some major cities on the Zephyr line, including Lincoln, Omaha, Grand Junction, and Salt Lake City.

The Zephyr takes a scenic route through the mountains between Denver and Glenwood Springs. Much of the route follows the Colorado River and is away from roads and major development.

Starting in August 2021, the Canada-based luxury rail excursion company Rocky Mountaineer has provided direct passenger rail service between Moab, Utah and Denver, Colorado (with an overnight stop in Glenwood Springs, Colorado) on its Rockies to the Red Rocks route.  The route has received widespread critical acclaim.

The local transportation authority is Roaring Fork Transportation Authority (RFTA, pronounced "rafta"). RFTA retains ownership of the land previously used for rail traffic to Aspen, a source of occasional consternation in balancing development needs. Proposals to introduce light rail to the valley remain unrealized but were not found economically feasible. VelociRFTA service described below currently serves that role, but RFTA remains committed to realizing the light-rail vision.

Bus
RFTA provides bus transit in Glenwood Springs and throughout the Roaring Fork Valley. VelociRFTA(pronounced "Veloci-rafta", a pun on velociraptor) BRT service, the first rural BRT in the United States, began in September 2013, offering connections between south Glenwood Springs and Aspen roughly every 15 minutes with a 60-minute total travel time.  Timetables vary by season, with different frequencies offered during spring, summer, autumn, and winter, to accommodate shifting seasonal demands.

The city also operates an intracity bus service, Ride Glenwood. Ride Glenwood offers a main route from the west side of town along the 6&24 corridor, through downtown, to the south part of Glenwood along Hwy 82.

Greyhound Lines stops in Glenwood Springs on trips between New York and Las Vegas twice per day.

Bus service is provided twice daily by Bustang and runs from Glenwood Springs to both Grand Junction and Denver.

Automobile
I-70 is one of the main east–west routes through the Rocky Mountains.

Airport
Glenwood Springs Airport (KGWS), a municipal airport, was built in the early 1940s. The airport was named the 4th most challenging mountain airport by the Aircraft Owners and Pilots Association (AOPA). The main reasons cited were the airport's mountainous location, the runway, and the unpredictable wind gusts, which caused a crash in 2007.  In 2004 a Cessna crashed into an apartment near the airport due to engine problems.  Visitors to Glenwood Springs more often depart and arrive from Aspen, Eagle, or Denver.

Recreation
Glenwood Springs is known for outdoor recreation, today joined by cultural facilities.

Hot Springs

The hot springs were used by local indigenous people long before the colonization of the Americas, most recently by the Utes. The hot springs were used by Native Americans for the medicinal properties of the water. Before 1800, the area was considered to be of "sacred status" to the Ute people.

Yampah Hot Springs vapor caves are historic underground geothermal steam baths. They were historically used by the Ute people as a source of rejuvenation and healing. There have been tensions between the local Ute people in relation to the use of the caves. Today, the vapor caves consist of three connecting rock chambers. Cave temperatures average .

Iron Mountain Hot Springs features smaller mineral water soaking pools. The underlying geothermal resources and land have been developed and closed several times.

Skiing
Sunlight Ski Area operates a brick and mortar store for lift tickets, rentals, repairs, and equipment in downtown Glenwood. There is downhill and cross country skiing in the area through areas dense with aspen trees

Rafting, kayaking, and fishing
Two of the largest rivers in Colorado, the Colorado River and the Roaring Fork River, converge in Glenwood Springs. Both are used for recreation by locals, visitors and commercial outfitters. The waters of the Roaring Fork flowing through Glenwood Springs proper are "Gold Medal" fishing waters, formally so designated by Colorado Parks and Wildlife. There is a dedicated Glenwood Whitewater Park.

Mountain biking
Nearby Carbondale is a mountain biking destination, while Glenwood Springs is planning to make the rugged terrain surrounding town available to riders. There are mountain bike trails in the Roaring Fork Valley, some of which are rigorous.

Golf
Glenwood Springs is home to a 9-hole golf course referred to by locals as "The Hill" and is within driving distance of mountain golf. Lakota Canyon in nearby New Castle received Golf Magazine's "Best of America's New Courses" list. Ironbridge golf course is located south of Glenwood Springs and River Valley Ranch golf course is located in nearby Carbondale.

Bike trails
Two scenic  trails host Glenwood Springs as one of the endpoints. The Glenwood Canyon Recreational Trail winds  through Glenwood Canyon.

The Rio Grande Trail runs roughly  along the former local Denver and Rio Grande Western Railroad, reaching all the way to Aspen in a rails-to-trails project featured by the Rails-to-Trails Conservancy as the Trail of the Month in April 2016.

Glenwood Caverns
Glenwood Caverns Adventure Park is a moderate-sized amusement park aimed at visitors of all ages.

Principal attractions are the caverns and a number of imported thrill rides, including an alpine coaster, the Giant Canyon Swing, which spins riders out over the cliff-edge of Glenwood Canyon to reflect on the Colorado River some 1300 ft below, and the Cliffhanger, a roller coaster which is literally bolted to the mountain.

Glenwood Vaudeville Revue
The Glenwood Vaudeville Revue offers a dinner theater show performing comedy skits, dances, and songs. An old downtown movie theater was purchased and renovated into a dedicated performance venue. The revue has been in professional performance since 2009.

Hanging Lake
The lake is reached via a trailhead located near I-70 in the bottom of the canyon. In the summer of 2010 the boardwalk at the lake was replaced. Due to environmental concerns, access to the trail to the lake is permissible only by a shuttle operating in partnership between the U.S. Forest Service and Glenwood Springs from downtown Glenwood Springs from the Community Center from May 1 to Oct. 31.

In the winter of 2018, maintenance and improvement work was performed on the trail.

Hanging Lake and its immediate surroundings were spared during the Grizzly Creek Fire that scorched much of Glenwood Canyon in 2020, along with the trail leading up to it. In the summer of 2021, significant rain events on the burn scar caused rockslides and debris flows throughout the Glenwood Canyon. The Hanging Lake Trail was severely damaged and has been closed indefinitely while the City of Glenwood Springs and the Forest Service contemplate trail repairs.

Notable people
Louis Alterie – Chicago gangster involved in a gang shootout in Glenwood Springs in 1932 and exiled from Colorado the next year
Kid Curry – Wild West outlaw and gunman
Doc Holliday – Wild West gunfighter, gambler, and dentist
James Irwin – U.S. Air Force Colonel and NASA astronaut; the eighth man to walk on the Moon
Jack P. Juhan – U.S. Marine Corps Major general, who served in World War II and Korean War.
Bobby Julich – bike racer and silver medalist at the 2004 Athens Olympics
Benjamin Kunkel (born 1972), novelist and political economist
Scott McInnis – former U.S. congressman from Colorado
Blake Neubert – artist
Sarah Schleper – Alpine skier
John David Vanderhoof – former Colorado governor
Ledyard Tucker – mathematician

See also

Colorado
Bibliography of Colorado
Index of Colorado-related articles
Outline of Colorado
List of counties in Colorado
List of municipalities in Colorado
List of places in Colorado
List of statistical areas in Colorado
Edwards-Glenwood Springs, CO Combined Statistical Area
Glenwood Springs, CO Micropolitan Statistical Area
Glenwood Hot Springs

References

External links

City of Glenwood Springs website
Glenwood Springs Fire Department
Glenwood Springs Police Department
CDOT map of the City of Glenwood Springs
Glenwood Tourism:
Glenwood Springs Chamber Resort Association
Visitglenwood.com, Glenwood Springs official travel website

 
Cities in Garfield County, Colorado
Roaring Fork Valley
Hot springs of Colorado
County seats in Colorado
Spa towns in the United States
Cities in Colorado
Populated places established in 1883
1883 establishments in Colorado
1885 establishments in Colorado